The chestnut myotis (Myotis badius) is a species of mouse-eared bat in the family Vespertilionidae. It is found in South Asia.

Taxonomy 
The bat's initial holotype and paratypes were found in the Longxu, Xianren, Dashi, and Huyan Caves across the Yunnan province in China. Further analysis and comparison of these specimens with other Myotis species suggested that the Yunnan specimens possessed characteristics of baculum morphology and cranial proportions that made them a distinct species.

References 

Mouse-eared bats
Mammals described in 2011
Bats of Asia